Church End Mill is a grade II listed Tower mill at Great Dunmow, Essex, England which has been converted to residential use.

History

Church End Mill was built by William Redington, a miller from Harlow in 1822 for  John Fuller. It incorporated a badly implemented second-hand machinery from a smock mill  from an unknown location and the total cost of the mill was £564 10s 6d. In 1840, a new cast iron windshaft and Patent sails were fitted, but the windshaft snapped during a gale on 13 November, less than three months after it had been fitted. The sails landed on the outbuildings connected with the mill. The mill remained in the ownership of John Fuller until his death in 1887.
The mill did little trade after 1894, and ceased work c1902, the sails being removed then. By 1907 it was being used as a studio and during World War II  was used as an observation post, the cap having been removed by then. A new cap was fitted in 1974 by millwright Philip Barrett-Lennard. The mill has been house converted, with no machinery remaining inside.

Description

Church End Mill is a four-storey tower mill with a conical cap with a ball finial. The mill had four  single Patent sails carried on a cast-iron windshaft and was winded by a six-bladed fantail. There was a stage at first-floor level. Two pairs of French Burr millstones were driven by wind, with a third pair by steam engine towards the end of the mill’s working life.

The clasp arm elm great spur wheel was  diameter, with 105 cogs. It drove two elm stone nuts of  diameter, each having 28 cogs.

Millers
Richard Hitching 1834–1840
Harvey 1874 -
William Henry Harvey 1882 - 1894

References for above:-

External links
Windmill World webpage on Church End Mill

References

Tower mills in the United Kingdom
Grinding mills in the United Kingdom
Industrial buildings completed in 1822
Grade II listed buildings in Essex
Great Dunmow
Grade II listed windmills
1822 establishments in England